Vera Filatova (born 6 November 1982), also known as Vera Graziadei, is a Ukrainian-British actress. She has played Elena in Channel 4's cult series Peep Show alongside David Mitchell and Robert Webb, Eva in Lesbian Vampire Killers with James Corden and Mathew Horne; and Svetlana in a five-part BBC1 drama The Deep opposite Minnie Driver, James Nesbitt and Goran Višnjić.

Personal life
Filatova was educated at Brighton College, and is married to Italian architect Robin Monotti Graziadei. They live in London with their son and daughter.

Career
Filatova's TV credits include The Last Detective (ITV), All About Me (BBC One), The Bill, Spooks, The Pagan Queen (USA), Agatha Christie: Poirot (ITV), Blue Murder, The Deep (BBC1), Me and Mrs Jones (BBC1). She appeared in the 2009 comedy horror film Lesbian Vampire Killers with James Corden and Matthew Horne, and played Elena in series 6 of the Channel 4 sitcom Peep Show opposite David Mitchell and Robert Webb.

Filmography

Film

Television

References

External links
 
The TOTAL FILM list of sexiest rising stars of 2009

1982 births
Living people
British film actresses
British people of Ukrainian descent
British television actresses
People educated at Brighton College
People from Khartsyzk
Ukrainian film actresses
Ukrainian television actresses
British Buddhists
21st-century Ukrainian actresses
Ukrainian expatriates in England